Shannonvale is a rural locality in the Shire of Douglas, Queensland, Australia. In the  Shannonvale had a population of 202 people.

Geography 
The Great Dividing Range passes through the location, which has the following named peaks:

 Perseverance Mountain (The Lookout) 
 Round Mountain 
 The Bluff

History 
In the  Shannonvale had a population of 202 people.

References 

Shire of Douglas
Localities in Queensland